David Frederick Cottrell (1947-2009) was a British academic who became a Senior Lecturer, Physiology Department then Preclinical Vet Sciences at The Royal (Dick) School of Veterinary Studies, in Edinburgh, Scotland.

Cottrell specialised in sensory neurophysiology, ruminant and equine alimentary physiology, and equine gastroenterology.  He contributed to the Journal of Physiology, Neuron and Nature.

Education 
Cottrell was born in 1947 in Tiverton, Devon.  He graduated from the University of Liverpool, Faculty of Veterinary Science in 1970 going on to gain his Ph.D.on “Duodenal Sensory and Reflex Mechanisms” from The University of Edinburgh in 1981.

Teaching 
Cottrell came to Edinburgh and joined the physiology teaching staff in October 1973.  A year later he took up MSc post-graduate studies in the department and in October 1975 was appointed lecturer.

Publications 
 Cottrell, D.F. (1981), 'Duodenal sensory and reflex mechanisms', Thesis (Ph.D.) University of Edinburgh
 Cottrell, D.F. (2010), 'Principles and concepts in body systems', Edinburgh: Royal Dick School of Veterinary Studies
 Takasaki, Midori ; Kitamura, Nobuo ; Hondo, Eiichi ; Cottrell, David F. ; Yamada, Junzo (1998), 'Three-Dimensional Development of Bovine Reticular Cell (Cellula reticuli)' European Journal of Morphology, February 1998, Vol.36(1), pp. 57–64
 Felipe A. Court ; Diane L. Sherman ; Thomas Pratt ; Emer M. Garry ; Richard R. Ribchester ; David F. Cottrell ; Susan M. Fleetwood-Walker ; Peter J. Brophy (2004), 'Restricted growth of Schwann cells lacking Cajal bands slows conduction in myelinated nerves'. Nature, 2004, Vol.431(7005), p. 191

References 

1947 births
2009 deaths
English veterinarians
Alumni of the University of Edinburgh
Academics of the University of Edinburgh